Lazılar (also, Lazylar) is a village in the Tovuz Rayon of Azerbaijan.  The village forms part of the municipality of Ağbaşlar.

References 

Populated places in Tovuz District